Grace Santos is an American film producer, actor, and former lawyer.

Early life
Santos is a graduate of the University of Miami and Stetson Law School. She later worked as an attorney in the Tampa Bay Area until 2012, when she relocated to Los Angeles in order to pursue a career in acting and film producing, after graduating from a producer's certificate at UCLA.

Acting and producing
In 2015 she produced the short film Odessa with David Moscow, a story that follows "a mother who must survive a trek across post-apocalyptic Texas to save her daughter's life." Additionally, she produced the films Silk, and Spun, for which she was awarded an Honorable Mention from the Producers Guild of America in its Weekend Shorts Challenge. In 2016 Santos co-starred in and produced the series Bree Does Comedy, and produced the film Election Night with Catherine Dent.

Executive career
Santos has represented RLJ Entertainment in the negotiation of film rights, such as the Nicolas Cage film Pay the Ghost, the Hugh Grant film The Rewrite, and the Kurt Russell film Bone Tomahawk, when she was the company's Director of Business and Legal Affairs. She later became the Director of Business Affairs for Bentonville Film Festival co-founded by Geena Davis. Santos now co-owns Hot Tin Roof Productions with producing partner Catherine Dent.

References

External links
 
 Hot Tin Roof Productions

Living people
American film actresses
American women film producers
Place of birth missing (living people)
University of Miami alumni
Year of birth missing (living people)
21st-century American women